Olaf Sørensen (30 November 1917 – 25 May 2008) was a Danish long-distance runner. He competed in the marathon at the 1952 Summer Olympics.

References

External links
 

1917 births
2008 deaths
Athletes (track and field) at the 1952 Summer Olympics
Danish male long-distance runners
Danish male marathon runners
Olympic athletes of Denmark
Sportspeople from Aarhus